Albert Chandler may refer to:

Ben Chandler (Albert Benjamin Chandler III, born 1959), American politician from Kentucky and grandson of Happy Chandler
Happy Chandler (Albert Benjamin Chandler Sr., 1898–1991), member of the Baseball Hall of Fame and American politician
Albert Brown Chandler (1840–1923), founder of the Postal Telegraph Company